Sergey Vladimirovich Bykov (alternate spelling: Sergei Bykov) (born February 26, 1983) is a Russian former professional basketball player and basketball coach.

Professional playing career

Club career
Bykov began playing with the junior youth clubs of Spartak Moscow. He made his professional debut with Spartak Moscow during the 2000–01 season. He moved to Dynamo Moscow before the 2001–02 season.

He then moved to Universitet Surgut before the 2004–05 season. He then returned to Dynamo Moscow before the 2005–06 season. In 2010, he joined CSKA Moscow, signing a three-year contract worth €4.5 million euros net income.

Only one year later, in June 2011 he signed with Lokomotiv Kuban. He parted ways with Lokomotiv on February 14, 2014. Five days layer, he signed with UNICS Kazan. On July 10, 2015, he parted ways with UNICS.

On July 13, 2015, he returned to Lokomotiv Kuban for the 2015–16 season.

On December 5, 2016, he signed with Avtodor Saratov for the rest of the season. Bykove retired from playing professional basketball after the 2016–17 season.

Russian national team
Bykov was also a member of the senior Russian national basketball team. With Russia's senior national team, he won the gold medal at EuroBasket 2007, and the bronze medal at EuroBasket 2011.

Coaching career
After retiring from playing professional basketball in 2017, Bykov started working as a basketball coach. He became an assistant coach with the senior men's Russian national basketball team, in August 2017.

References

External links
 Sergei Bykov at euroleague.net
 Sergei Bykov at vtb-league.com
 Sergei Bykov at fiba.com (archive)

1983 births
Living people
2010 FIBA World Championship players
Basketball players at the 2008 Summer Olympics
BC Avtodor Saratov players
BC Dynamo Moscow players
BC Spartak Saint Petersburg players
BC UNICS players
FIBA EuroBasket-winning players
Olympic basketball players of Russia
PBC CSKA Moscow players
PBC Lokomotiv-Kuban players
Point guards
Russian basketball coaches
Russian men's basketball players
Shooting guards